Child of Manhattan is a 1932 play by Preston Sturges, his fifth to be produced on Broadway and his last for almost twenty years as his career took him to Hollywood. It was adapted into a film of the same name, released in 1933 by Columbia Pictures, the second play of Sturges' to make it to the silver screen, after 1929's Strictly Dishonorable.

Broadway production
Sturges wrote Child of Manhattan in 16 days. The out-of-town tryout took place at the Broadstreet Theatre in Newark, New Jersey, where the play received very good audience response.

The Broadway production opened at the Fulton Theatre on March 1, 1932, and logged 87 performances, closing in May of that year. It was produced by Peggy Fears and A. C. Blumenthal and directed by Howard Lindsay.

Critical response was poor, and included such assessments as "Sheer trash," "deeply offensive," and commented on its "bathos and sweetish bosh." Time magazine said that the play was "as silly as it is trite."

Broadway cast
The opening night cast included:

John Altieri as John Tarantino
Franz Bendtsen as Lucinda, Limited
Alexander Campbell as Doctor Charley
Douglass Dumbrille as Panama C. Kelly
Dorothy Hall as Madeleine McGonegal
Jackson Halliday as Buddy McGonegal
Maude Odell as Mrs. McGonegal

Reginald Owen as Otto Paul Vanderkill
Jessie Ralph as Aunt Minnie
Joseph H. Roeder as Eggleston
Harriet Russell as Luthy McGonegal
Ralph Sanford as Spyrene
Helen Strickland as Miss Sophie Vanderkill
Elizabeth Young as Adelaide Vanderkill

References
Notes

External links
 
 
 
 

Plays by Preston Sturges
1932 plays
American plays adapted into films